Dulce María Espinosa Saviñón (born 6 December 1985), simply known as Dulce María, is a Mexican actress, songwriter, singer and author.

Dulce María began her career at age 5, participating in more than 100 TV commercials. At 11 she was part of her first musical group, KIDS. At 15 she joined the group, Jeans. She starred in many successful telenovelas, including El vuelo del águila (1994), Nunca te olvidaré (1999), Clase 406 (2002), Rebelde (2004), Corazón que miente (2016) and Muy padres (2017).

Dulce María reached international success in 2004 after starring in Televisa's telenovela Rebelde and being part of the twice-nominated for a Latin Grammy Award group RBD, who sold over 15 million records worldwide.

Since 2009, Dulce María has worked in her solo musical career, after signing to Universal Music Latin, her extended play Extranjera - Primera Parte (2010) debuted at number one on Mexico's Asociación Mexicana de Productores de Fonogramas y Videogramas chart and became the first Mexican artist to certified a platinum award in Brazil. Dulce María has released four solo albums: Extranjera - Segunda Parte (2011) Sin Fronteras (2014), DM (2017) and Origen (2021).

Dulce María has won several international awards as MTV Europe Music Award, Premios TVyNovelas, People en Español Award, Premios Juventud and in the American, Mexican and Brazilian editions of the Nickelodeon Kids' Choice Awards. She was chosen as one of the most beautiful by magazines as People en Español and Quien and is one of the most influential Mexican on Twitter.

Early life
Dulce María was born on 6 December 1985, in Mexico City. She has two sisters, Blanca Ireri and Claudia. She has German, Native Mexican, and Spanish ancestry and is the great-niece of painter Frida Kahlo. She stated in an interview with Go Pride that "my grandmother is her sister", although other interviews say she was her first cousin. As a child, Dulce María began doing television commercials.  In 1993, at the age of 8, she was cast in Plaza Sesamo, Mexico's version of Sesame Street and appeared in both live action and as animated in the show's live action/animated opening credits which was produced by Oscar González Loyo. She also appeared in various Mexican commercials during her young age, including the Mexican furniture store Viana during Mother's Day.  She was later cast in El Club de Gaby and participated in several specials on the Mexican Discovery Kids channel. She began to work in soap operas in Televisa but she discovered her real passion when she was given the opportunity to participate in a music project called Rebelde.

Music career

In 1996 Dulce joined the Mexican music group K.I.D.S.. They were  very popular among children in Mexico and released  her   hit single beautiful a duet with Akon . In 1999, Dulce decided to leave the group due to personal reasons. After her departure from K.I.D.S., Dulce and her then boyfriend, Daniel Habif, also a member of K.I.D.S., decided to start their own group called D&D. They recorded five songs but, for unknown reasons, split up. In early 2000, Dulce replaced Angie in Jeans, a female Latin pop group. She left the group after two years due to landing the main role of Marcela Mejía in the 2002 telenovela, Clase 406 which starred the Mexican singer and actress. Other members from RBD also starred in the telenovela before the group launched in 2004.

Dulce begin acting in movies and was eventually cast as one of the main characters in Rebelde. The success of Rebelde launched RBD made up of Dulce, Maite Perroni, Christian Chávez, Alfonso Herrera, Anahí, and Christopher von Uckermann. The group made 9 studio albums, including records in Spanish, Portuguese and English. To date, they have sold over 20 million albums worldwide, and toured across Mexico, South America, Serbia, Romania, the United States, and Spain. On 15 August 2008, RBD released a message telling fans that they had decided to split up. They went on one final tour, Gira del Adiós World Tour which ended in 2008. On 25 November 2008, Dulce collaborated with Tiziano Ferro and Anahí on a song called El regalo màs grande. Following the breakup of RBD, Dulce signed with Universal Music and announced that she began recording in 2009 as a solo artist.

Solo projects

In 2009, she recorded two new songs for the novela, Verano de amor, called "Verano" and "Déjame Ser", a song she co-wrote along with Carlos Lara. Dulce also collaborated with Akon, to remix his song "Beautiful". They performed the song together at the 2009 radio concert, El Evento 40.

Dulce María released her first solo single on 17 May 2010, titled "Inevitable". The music video was released on 24 May and was directed by Argentinean director Francisco d'Amorim Lima. Dulce María's solo album Extranjera was originally set to be released on 7 September, but the release date was changed due to the recording of some new tracks. The album was then set to be released 9 November 2010, with her stating on Twitter "We have more surprises for you guys so be patient!". The surprise was that the album was going to be divided in two: Extranjera Primera Parte, with 7 tracks, including the hit "Inevitable", released on 9 November 2010 and Extranjera Segunda Parte with 7 more tracks plus a DVD with extras. On 9 November 2010, Dulce María presented her album with a showcase at the Lunario and announced her second single "Ya No", which will be featured on the second part of the album set to be released in the summer of 2011. The song is a cover of the late singer Selena from the album Amor Prohibido. The song began playing on radios on 16 November 2010.

On 14 January 2011, a preview clip was released for Dulce's new single "Ya No" showing her in 3 different outfits, and in the last scene arguing with her love interest. Dulce Maria's music video for "Ya No" was released on 10 February on her personal YouTube channel, DulceMariaLive, earlier than planned due to it being leaked. Dulce Maria announced on her official YouTube account that Extranjera Segunda Parte would be released on 14 June 2011.

On 2016, Dulce began recording her third studio album titled "DM". The record was finished in August 2016, and was released on 10 March 2017. In 2017 she started DM World Tour promoting the album, where she performed in countries as Mexico, Brazil and Spain.

In 2018 she announced that she is preparing a new album that will be called Origen, who will only have songs that she composed. She announced a concert at the Teatro Metropólitan in Mexico City to present part of these songs, the album is expected to launch in 2019.

Acting career

Following her success as a child star, Dulce began to star in teen-oriented telenovelas such as El Juego de la Vida and Clase 406. In Clase 406, she worked alongside Alfonso Herrera, Anahí, and Christian Chávez, who later became her bandmates in RBD. In 2004, she was cast as one of the main characters in Rebelde, a Mexican remake of the hit Argentinian telenovela, Rebelde Way.  Dulce played Roberta Pardo, the strong-willed daughter of a famous Mexican singer. Rebelde was a hit worldwide and had over 400 episodes, airing from 2004 until 2006. In 2006, the actress received the TV Y Novelas award for Best Young Telenovela Actress for her work in Rebelde.

Following the success of Rebelde in 2007, Televisa released RBD: La familia, which starred the members of RBD.  The sitcom was based on the fictional lives of the members of RBD. The characters of the sitcom were not based on the band's characters in Rebelde, but intended to be similar to the actors' real personalities. RBD: La Familia was the first Mexican series shot entirely in High Definition. The show ran from 14 March 2007 – 13 June 2007 and only had 13 episodes.

In 2009, Dulce starred in the telenovela Verano de amor, alongside Gonzalo Garcia Vivanco and Ari Borovoy, also produced by Pedro Damián, where she interpreted the theme songs of the telenovela, Verano and Déjame Ser; Dulce was cast as Miranda. The telenovela premiered on 9 February 2009, replacing the series Juro Que Te Amo.  Verano de amor incorporated messages into the novela promoting environmental responsibility, an extension of Televisa's "Televisa Verde" initiative focused on the environment.

In 2010 she received the prize of People en Español as Best Young Actress for the telenovela Verano de amor.

In April 2010 Dulce Maria was cast as a Lupita in a new independent film project, directed by Gonzalo Justiniano, "Alguien Ha Visto A Lupita?" (Has Anyone Seen Lupita?) starring alongside Chilean actor Cristián de la Fuente. The film was released in March 2011.
Dulce Maria was in fashion line Cklass with her ex colleague Maite Perroni. Dulce was in TV show Clase 406 with actors Anahi, Alfonso Herrera, and Christian Chavez. The two latter of the three were also in a group with Dulce which was also named Clase 406.

In 2013, Dulce starred in a return to the telenovela in Mentir para Vivir.

In 2015, she appeared in a PETA video discouraging people from attending circuses that use animals.

In 2016, Dulce starred as the first antagonist role debut in the telenovela Corazón que miente.

In 2018, Dulce starred in the telenovela Muy padres.

In July 2018, Dulce Maria joined Peta campaign against SeaWorld.

Philanthropy

Throughout her career, Dulce María has been participateing in several humanitarian campaigns. In September 2009 was chosen by Google, Save the Children and Chicos.net as the representative of the campaign Technology Yes that is responsible for promoting the good use of the internet among young people. In October Dulce created her own foundation called Fundación Dulce Amanecer with the objective of contributing to social causes, ranging from supporting the communities of support of indigenous women to caring for the environment, the singer maintains the foundation with the support of his followers around the world and donations and sweepstakes of her personal items. On account of its foundation, in 2011 Nickelodeon Latin America announced that Dulce María would receive the Pro Social Award of the Kids Choice Awards Mexico 2011. Dulce received the green blimp, a special award that distinguishes those who receive this recognition. The Social Pro Award is presented in other countries as the United States and Brazil under the Big Green Help strategy, established by Nickelodeon. This recognition is given to people who stand out for their actions and impact on the environment or society, such as Michelle Obama in 2010.

In February 2010, Dulce María along with Alfonso Herrera were presented to the media at the Auditorio Nacional of Mexico City as representatives of Expo Joven 2010, an event that aimed to demonstrate against the violence and insecurity that plagues Mexico, especially in Chihuahua. On 20 February, Dulce went to the Chihuahua City as part of Expo Joven, where she gave a lecture on the theme "friendship."

In August 2012, Dulce María helped build and open a playground located in Lynwood, California, at the invitation of KaBOOM! and Kool-Aid who sponsored this space designed to promote physical activity among minors and reduce obesity levels in this sector of the population. Dulce carried out activities that varied from painting the place, mixing cement, cutting the ribbon of the inauguration and besides taking pictures with the Hispanic families and volunteers that participated in the event. In October, Dulce was the representative of the campaign Mujeres a Tiempo organized by Televisa Monterrey, a campaign that fights against breast cancer. So committed to this cause, Dulce composed and recorded a theme, Reloj de arena, to be the campaign anthem, in addition to having recorded a video for the theme in several places of Monterrey accompanied by women who are part of Mexican associations like Mexican Red Cross, Unidas Contigo and Supera. Dulce was photographed by director and producer Pedro Torres for the Mexican magazine Quién, as part of the campaign Tócate – Por un México sin cáncer de mama, a campaign where 28 women who participate together to give voice and create health awareness and early detection of breast cancer, and aims to provide funding for the Fundación del Cáncer de Mama (FUCAM). With the images of the 28 women who participated, a gallery was made that remained on display during October on Paseo de la Reforma, Mexico City. In December during the end-of-year party period, Dulce visited with her sister, Blanca, a hospital that cares for children with Cancer in Mexico. During her visit Dulce delivered toys and talked with the children.

In September 2013, Dulce along with artists like Lucero and Reik recorded ¡Súmate Ya!, the official theme of the campaign to gather support for those affected by Hurricane Ingrid and Hurricane Manuel. In November, Dulce became the image of MTV's global campaign Someone Like Me, along with SICO, a global campaign to inform and create conversation among young people about sex, sexual health, and ultimately reach an HIV-free generation. Dulce participated in an event in Mexico, with the participation of DJ Benjamin Diamond, to talk about the theme. In December, Dulce joins the Televisa Foundation campaign, "Live the Dream," an initiative for English-language learner in public schools in the United States. On 9 December, she visited "Burbank Middle School" located in the city of Houston, Texas. Through this campaign, she told of her experiences of overcoming to inspire students to define their goals and how to work to overcome them.

In March 2015, Dulce joined the People for the Ethical Treatment of Animals (PETA), to condemn the abuse of elephants in circuses in the United States. In an interview with the agency AP, the singer said her interest in protecting elephants came during a trip to Thailand in 2014. In the video she filmed for the campaign, she asks people not to go to the circuses that use animals and explains in detail all the ill-treatment to which elephants are subjected so that they may perform their function. Dulce also applauds the fact that Mexico has already banned the use of wild animals in circuses. In June, during her visit to Chile for her tour, Dulce visited the Corporación de Ayuda al Niño Quemado (COANIQUEM), appearing captivated by the cause, actively sharing with the children attended at the foundation. In November, on the International Day for the Elimination of Violence against Women, Dulce joined the #NiUnaMás campaign that seeks to sensitize all Mexicans to the problem of gender violence. Through her Twitter account, she published an image of you with the message: "#DiNoALaViolencia #LaViolenciaDestruye". Like her, other personalities have joined this campaign which was launched by Fundación Origen through its website where men and women are invited to take a photo and then share in their networks and create a greater impact.

In January 2016, Dulce María joins the #LeerMx – Lo Que Importa Esta En Tu Cabeza, organized by the Mexico Communication Council, the concept of the campaign means to the youth beyond their appearance, what really matters is what is in their head and, in this sense, reading is the tool that gives them more, that is, through it they can express themselves, create, participate and build their own personality. In October, Dulce once again joins a campaign against Breast Cancer. Now as ambassador of the fourth edition of the campaign Vive con Glamour by Glamor magazine. Initiative held every year during the National Breast Cancer Awareness Month which aims to have women perform self-examination.

On 23 February 2017, Dulce María joined the ambassador, along with Juan Pablo Manzanero and singer Kalimba, to the campaign of the Christian aid organization World Vision International, which helps to change the reality of Latin American children subjected to abuse and violence in all its forms. During the press conference, Dulce emphasized that it is time to join efforts to give a message throughout Mexico and the rest of Latin America, as well as other parts of the world to reinforce what the organization does for children. Dulce along with singers like Cristian Castro and Kalimba released the song Da Amor as official song of World Vision.

Personal life

Dulce's great aunt was the Mexican painter Frida Kahlo. Dulce's grandmother has been described as either Frida's first cousin or her sister.

In 2007 as well as in 2010, 2011, 2016 and 2017 the magazine People en Español named her one of "50 Most Beautiful".

Her first kiss was at age 11 with Daniel Habif, her bandmate in Kid’s, in the backstage of a photoshoot. They dated for five years, from 1997 until 2002.

Dulce met Alfonso Herrera in 2002 while they were shooting the telenovela Clase 406, and they were in a relationship until April 2005. From late 2005 to April 2006, she dated Mexican goalkeeper Guillermo Ochoa. In 2008, Dulce started dating actor Pablo Lyle, while they were shooting Verano de Amor, but they broke up one year later. Also, in September 2009, the singer was chosen by Google, Save the Children and Chicos.net as representative of the Technology Yes campaign aimed at promoting the appropriate use of technology and the Internet among children and youth.

On 9 November 2019, she married Mexican producer, Paco Álvarez, in a small ceremony in Jojutla, Mexico.

On 8 June 2020, the artist announced via her Instagram that she and Álvarez were expecting their first child. Their daughter María Paula was born on November 27th, 2020.

Filmography

Films

Television

Discography

Studio albums
 Extranjera - Segunda Parte (2011)
 Sin Fronteras (2014)
 DM (2017)
 Origen (2021)

Tours
 Extranjera On Tour (2011–2012)
 Sin Fronteras On Tour (2014–2015)
 DM World Tour (2017)
 Origen Tour (2022)
 RBD Soy Rebelde Tour (2023)

Written works
 Dulce Amargo (2007)
 Dulce Amargo – Recuerdos de una adolescente (2014)

Awards

References

External links

 

Dulce
Actresses from Mexico City
Dulce
Mexican child actresses
Mexican film actresses
Mexican telenovela actresses
Musicians from Mexico City
Singers from Mexico City
Mexican women singers
Mexican women pop singers
Mexican women singer-songwriters
Mexican singer-songwriters
Portuguese-language singers of Mexico
Universal Music Latin Entertainment artists
RBD members
Frida Kahlo
Women in Latin music